Romsey Abbey is the name currently given to a parish church of the Church of England in Romsey, a market town in Hampshire, England. Until the Dissolution of the Monasteries it was the church of a Benedictine nunnery. The surviving Norman-era church is the town's outstanding feature and is now the largest parish church in the county of Hampshire since changes in county boundaries led to the larger Christchurch Priory being now included in Dorset. The current vicar is the Reverend Thomas Wharton, who took up the post in September 2018.

Monastic history
The church was originally built during the 10th century, as part of a monastic foundation of Benedictine women.

The religious community continued to grow and a village grew around it. Both suffered already in the 10th century, when Viking raiders sacked the village and burnt down the original church in 993. However, the abbey was rebuilt in stone in around 1000 and the village quickly recovered. The abbey and its community of nuns flourished and was renowned as a seat of learning – especially for the children of the nobility.

In Norman times a substantial, new stone abbey was built on the old Anglo-Saxon foundation (circa 1130 to 1140 AD) by Henry Blois, Bishop of Winchester and Abbot of Glastonbury, younger brother of King Stephen. In this general period, the community prospered and by 1240 the nuns numbered more than 100.

It was in this period that the dramatic case arose of Princess Marie (1136- 1182), youngest daughter of Stephen of England. Marie had become a novice at the Priory of Lillechurch in Kent, but transferred to Romsey in the years 1148–1155, being elected Abbess in 1155, the year following her father's death. In 1159, the death of her brother William left her as the suo jure Countess of Boulogne and the following year prompted Matthew of Alsace to abduct her from her abbey and force her to marry him despite of her religious vows, so that he became jure uxoris Count of Boulogne and co-ruler. Though couple had two daughters, the marriage was annulled in 1170 and Marie returned to life as a Benedictine nun at the Abbey of Sainte-Austreberthe at Montreuil, where she died in 1182, aged about 46.

Despite the faithful service in prayer of many of the nuns over many centuries, there are scattered traces of irregularities in the conduct of the house, of which the evidence would merit impartial investigation with modern historiographical methods, rather than stale prejudice. Some sources accuse the abbess Elizabeth Broke (1472-1502) of ruling over a period of scandal, including allowing poor dress standards for nuns, allowing nuns to go to the towns taverns, poor account keeping and an unhealthy relationships with the Chaplain.

The abbey continued to grow and prosper until the Black Death struck the town in 1348–9. While it is thought that as much as half of the population of the town – which was then about 1,000 – died as a result, the number of nuns fell by over 80% to 19. 72 nuns died including Abbess Johanna. After the plague there were never more than 26 nuns in the Abbey.

This so affected the area that the overall prosperity of the abbey dwindled, though it remained an important local institution and continued its traditional functions of prayer and charity towards the local people.

List of Abbesses of Romsey

Post-Reformation parish
Although the community of nuns itself was forcibly dispersed in the Dissolution of the Monasteries, the abbey buildings escaped the general fate of other religious and charitable establishments at this time and were not demolished. This was because the abbey church had a substantial section dedicated to St Lawrence which served as a place of worship for the townspeople. This arrangement, found also elsewhere in various forms, was designed to preserve the particular life of the nuns, with its heavy schedule of church services, from encroachment by the needs of the people. The latter were catered for, however, by celebrations of the liturgy ensured by the nuns' chaplains.

Subsequently, the town purchased the abbey buildings from the Crown for £100 in 1544. The operation presumably aimed, under the cloak of public service, at furthering private interests, since the town's magnates then soon set about demolishing that very section, set aside as the church of St Lawrence, that had ensured the survival of buildings in the first place. All over the country, the demolition of religious buildings brought for private enterprise a rich harvest of lead and building materials.

During the English Civil War the building suffered further material damage at the hands of Parliamentarian troops in 1643, including destruction of the organ.

What survives of the abbey buildings today, though limited to a remodelled and restored form of the former abbey church, is arguably due especially to the efforts of a 19th-century incumbent, the Reverend Edward Lyon Berthon. It is now forms the largest Church of England parish church in the county of Hampshire.

Bells
The church's bells were once housed in a detached campanile. After its demolition in 1625, the set of six bells was transferred to a wooden belfry on top of the central tower.  They were replaced by a new set of eight in 1791; the heaviest, the tenor, weighing 26 cwt. Three of the bells were recast in 1932. The bells and their eighteenth century bell frame were restored in 2007, when removing the crown reduced the weight of the tenor to 22 cwt. The bells are now known across the region for being one of the finest rings of 8 bells.

Music

Choir
Romsey Abbey has a traditional choir of boy choristers and a back row of adult altos, tenors and basses drawn from the local area. They also have a choir of girls, a senior girls choir, a training choir of youngsters and a consort of voluntary singers and members of the congregation who sing when the choirs are on holiday. Over the years the choirs have recorded multiple CDs, sung for royalty, enjoyed choir tours to numerous UK Cathedrals, Belgium, Italy and France and have a twinning relationship with a German choir from Mülheim an der Ruhr. They have appeared numerous times on BBC Songs of Praise as well as featuring in a BBC Documentary in 2018. The current director of music is Martin Seymour.

Organs
Romsey Abbey has two organs. The main instrument was built by J W Walker & Sons in 1858 and replaced an earlier instrument by Henry Coster. The Walker Organ was rebuilt in its present position and enlarged in 1888.  Major restoration work was carried out by J. W. Walker & Sons Ltd in 1995/96 under the supervision of the abbey's organist, Jeffrey Williams, restoring the mechanical actions and overhauling all of the pipe work. In 1999 a completely new nave organ by Walkers was constructed with its pipe work located on the south triforium. This can be played either from a mobile console in the nave or from the main console.

Organist and master of the choristers
Miss Elizabeth Smith (becomes Mrs Messum in 1835) ???? - 1835
S.T. Cromwell 1836 – 1849
Francis Wellman
??? Beazley
W. Mason 1864 – 1865 (afterwards organist of Trinity Church, South Shields)
E.W. Perren 1866 – 1867 (afterwards organist of St Thomas Church, Winchester)
W. Channon Cornwall 1867 – 1876
William Cary Bliss 1888 – 1899
J. C. Richards ca. 1907
R. T. Bevan ca. 1921
Charles Tryhorn 1926-1957
Charles Piper 1957-1980
Anthony Burns-Cox 1980–1990
Jeffrey Williams 1990–2004
Robert Fielding 2004–2015
George Richford 2015–2018 
Canon Peter Gould 2019–2019 (Interim Director of Music)
Martin Seymour 2019 - (Director of Music)

Assistant organists
Keith Tomkinson 1974-1982
Jeffrey Williams 1982–1990
Paul Isted 1991–1996
Timothy Rogerson 1996–2005
David Coram 2005–2008
James Eaton 2008–2010
Adrian Taylor 2011–2021
Richard McVeigh 2022-

Notable burials

Among the tombs housed in the present church are:

Reportedly, that of Prince Edmund Atheling (c. 966 – c. 970), the eldest son of Edgar the Peaceful, King of Northumbria and Mercia, by his third wife, Ælfthryth, the elder brother of King Æthelred the Unready (c. 968–1016) who died in infancy and was buried in the old Romsey Abbey.

John and Grissell St Barbe, both died in 1658. The family acquired the abbey estate shortly after the dissolution and held it until 1723.

William Petty (1623-1687), in his day a noted English economist, scientist, philosopher, Fellow of the Royal Society and politician. He first came to prominence serving Oliver Cromwell and the Commonwealth in Ireland and, like many others, later served under King Charles II and King James II. Knighted in 1661, he became the great-grandfather of Prime Minister William Petty Fitzmaurice, 2nd Earl of Shelburne and 1st Marquess of Lansdowne.

John Latham (1740-1837), English physician, naturalist and ornithologist, one of the first to examine scientifically birds discovered in Australia. He was elected to the Royal Society in 1775, took part in the creation of the Linnean Society, and in 1812, he was elected a foreign member of the Royal Swedish Academy of Sciences.

The Earl Mountbatten of Burma (1900–1979). On being given his Earldom in 1947, Mountbatten had been granted the lesser title of Baron Romsey and he lived locally at Broadlands House. On 27 August 1979, Mountbatten, his grandson Nicholas, and two others were assassinated by a bomb set by members of the Provisional Irish Republican Army, hidden aboard his fishing boat in Mullaghmore, County Sligo, Ireland. He was buried here following a Ceremonial Funeral in Westminster Abbey. By request, his grave is aligned north–south, rather than the conventional east–west, so that he faces the sea where his wife, Edwina's, ashes were scattered.

Buried in the churchyard is Major General Sir Richard Harman Luce (1867-1952), an English surgeon, British Army officer and politician, who served for a time as MP for Derby in 1924 and later as Mayor of Romsey.

Titanic connection

One of the 's engineering officers, Arthur (Bob) Ward, who died in the sinking, is commemorated in the Abbey with a plaque in one of the chapels.

St Swithun's, Crampmoor
The village of Crampmoor, to the east of Romsey, is within the ecclesiastical parish of Romsey. St Swithun's, Crampmoor, is Romsey Abbey's daughter church. It was built in the nineteenth century to serve a rural community as both a church and a school. There were originally two other such combined use buildings in the parish; the school moved out from St Swithun's in 1927.

See also

 List of English abbeys, priories and friaries serving as parish churches
 List of monasteries dissolved by Henry VIII of England

References

External links

Romsey Abbey Website
Romsey Abbey Choir Website
Romsey Abbey Images
Stained Glass Windows at Romsey Abbey

Monasteries in Hampshire
Benedictine monasteries in England
Benedictine nunneries in England
Christian monasteries established in the 10th century
Christian monasticism
10th-century establishments in England
1539 disestablishments in England
Women of medieval England
Religious buildings and structures completed in 907
Anglo-Saxon monastic houses
Abbeys in Hampshire
Tourist attractions in Hampshire
Grade I listed buildings in Hampshire
Burial sites of the Mountbatten family
Grade I listed monasteries
Romsey
Monasteries dissolved under the English Reformation